Helmut Bartuschek (25 December 1905 – 18 May 1984) was a German poet and translator of French literature.

Life 
Born Gliwice/Oberschlesien, Bartuschek moved to Leipzig in 1922, where he passed the Abitur in 1925 and studied Romance languages and literature, art history, philosophy and librarianship. In 1940, he was drafted for military service. After his release from French captivity (1944-1948) he lived in Leipzig again.

Bartuschek made his debut with poems in 1929 in an anthology edited by Klaus Mann. His first own volume of poetry was promoted by Georg Maurer.

Bartuschek died in Leipzig at the age of 74.

Work

Poetry 
 Erde, Leipzig 1938
 Verwandelte Welt, Berlin 1962
 Die Häutung des Schlangenkönigs, Leipzig 1983 (ed. ).
 Waldamtmann, 2016, .

Translations 
 Guy de Maupassant, Fettklößchen, Erzählungen 1950
 Guy de Maupassant, Eine Landpartie, 1965
 Guy de Maupassant, Pariser Abenteuer (with K. Friese), 1964
 Guy de Maupassant, Meisternovellen, 3 volumes, 1984
 Guy de Maupassant, Die lieben Verwandten und andere heitere Erzählungen, 1952
 Guy de Maupassant, Das Brot der Sünde, 1960
 Guy de Maupassant, Unter dem Siegel der Verschwiegenheit, 1961
 P. Arene, Carmantras Ende, 1952
 Der gallische Hahn, französische Gedichte von der Zeit der troubadors bis in unsere Tage in deutscher Nachdichtung. 1957
 Victor Hugo, Die schwarze Fahne, 1962
 Victor Hugo, Die schwarze Fahne, 1988
 Charles de Coster, Flämische Mähren, 1963
 Gustave Flaubert, November, 1984
 Gustave Flaubert, Leidenschaft und Tugend, 1988
 Prosper Mérimée, Auserlesene Novellen, 1951
 Prosper Mérimée, Colomba, 1990.

Prizes
 Literaturpreis der Stadt Leipzig 1938
 Kunstpreis der Stadt Leipzig, 1980.

Membership 
 Paul Ernst Gesellschaft

References

External links 
 

20th-century German writers
French–German translators
20th-century German poets
German male poets
1905 births
1984 deaths
People from Gliwice
20th-century German male writers